Sheykh Habil (also Romanized as Sheykh Hābīl; also known as Qal‘eh Golāb, Sheykh Ābil, Sheykh Hābīl-e Pā’īn, Sheykh Hābīl-e Soflá, and Sheykh Hābīl-e Vostá) is a village in Poshteh-ye Zilayi Rural District, Sarfaryab District, Charam County, Kohgiluyeh and Boyer-Ahmad Province, Iran. At the 2006 census, its population was 219, in 44 families.

References 

Populated places in Charam County